Hunt Airport  is a privately owned, public use airport in San Patricio County, Texas, United States. It is located two nautical miles (4 km) northwest of the central business district of Portland, Texas.

Facilities and aircraft 
Hunt Airport covers an area of 168 acres (68 ha) at an elevation of 40 feet (12 m) above mean sea level. It has one active runway designated 14L/32R which measures 2,650 by 20 feet (808 x 6 m) with an asphalt surface. A turf and gravel runway designated 14R/32L and measuring 1,400 by 60 feet (427 x 18 m) is closed indefinitely.

For the 12-month period ending March 4, 2011, the airport had 2,100 general aviation aircraft operations, an average of 175 per month. At that time there were seven single-engine aircraft based at this airport.

References

External links 
 Hunt Airport (9R5) at Texas DOT Airport Directory
 Aerial image as of January 1995 from USGS The National Map
 

Airports in Texas
Transportation in San Patricio County, Texas